George Barrow (11 December 1853 – 23 July 1932) was a British geologist.

Barrow was born in St George Hanover Square, London, the fifth of eight children born to John George Barrow, a general practitioner at the Royal College of Surgeons, and his wife, Eleanor Barrow.

Barrow matriculated at London University in 1871, holding a Turner scholarship. Admitted to King's College London, he studied science, winning prizes in mathematics and geology. He was the first to map a metamorphic gradient by determining a sequence of metamorphic zones in the metapelites of the Scottish Highlands. Every first appearance of an index mineral was taken by Barrow as the beginning of a new metamorphic zone. Later the underlying principles of metamorphic zones were clarified by the Finnish geologist Pentti Eskola, who introduced the concept of metamorphic facies. Barrow was awarded the Bolitho Medal of the Royal Geological Society of Cornwall in 1912.

He died in Chorleywood, Hertfordshire.

The Barrow Award of the Mineralogical Society of Great Britain & Ireland for contributions to metamorphic geology is named in his honour.

References

Selected publications
 
 
 
 
 

British geologists
1853 births
1932 deaths
Alumni of King's College London
Scientists from London
Presidents of the Geologists' Association